WCLM-LP was a broadcast radio station licensed to Woodstock, Virginia, serving the Woodstock/Edinburg area.  WCLM-LP was owned and operated by Portering the Glory International, Inc.

History
Shenandoah County Public Schools filed the original application and subsequent construction permits for WCLM-LP in February 2005.  Shenandoah County Public Schools sold the application to Portering the Glory International, Inc. for $1,000 in March 2007.

WCLM-LP signed on for the first time on March 12, 2008.

In October, 2010, WCLM-LP fell silent for unknown reasons.  The license for WCLM-LP was deleted on June 23, 2011.

References

External links
 

CLM-LP
Radio stations established in 2008
Radio stations disestablished in 2011
Defunct radio stations in the United States
C
Defunct religious radio stations in the United States
2008 establishments in Virginia
2011 disestablishments in Virginia
CLM-LP